Asind  is a city and a municipality in Bhilwara district, Rajasthan, India. It is a Tehsil (sub-division) for many villages The city have a magistrate office, lower justice court and many administrative hub for many major villages.

Geography 
It has an average elevation of 467 metres (1532 feet).
Asind is also the name of a Chinese Company located in Hangzhou, Zhejiang Province of China.
Mines is Located in Village Shambhugarh, Daultgarh, Roop-pura, Barana, Tehsil Asind, District Bhilwara in Rajasthan of Soda Feldspar Quartz and mica.
Tehsil Asind district Bhilwara, Rajasthan. This mine is enriched with one India's unique mineral deposit of Potassium feldspar, Quartz and mica and can meet any quantity at very short span of period. 
The joint capacity of both of these mines is around 150000 tons of mineral per annum.
In Asind there is many mines for Stone which is used to make Houses and buildings in many areas of Rajasthan.

Demographics 
 India census, Asind had a population of 14,118. Males constitute 51% of the population and females 49%. Asind has an average literacy rate of 54%, lower than the national average of 59.5%; with 63% of the males and 37% of females literate. 18% of the population is under 6 years of age.

Sri Sawai Bhoj Temple is famous temple in Bhilwara district. Sri Sawai Bhoj was father of Hindu god Devnarayan and was one of the 24 brave Gurjar brothers named as Bagaravats. The Sawai Bhoj Temple in Bhilwara is claimed to be more than 400 years old.

Asind is a Tehsil/Block in the Bhilwara District of Rajasthan. According to Census 2011 information the sub-district code of Asind block is 00627. There are about 196 villages in Asind block.

The MLA of Asind block is Shree Jabbar Singh Sankhla (BJP)  and BDO (block development officer) is Shree Amit Jain. The chairman of Asind municipality is Devi Lal Sahu

Notable people 
Jabbar Singh Sankhala
V. P. Singh Badnore

References 

Cities and towns in Bhilwara district